The Glorious Revolution is the term first used in 1689 to summarise events leading to the deposition of James II and VII of England, Ireland and Scotland in November 1688, and his replacement by his daughter Mary II and her husband and James's nephew William III of Orange, de facto ruler of the Dutch Republic. Known as the Glorieuze Overtocht or Glorious Crossing in the Netherlands,  it has been described both as the last successful invasion of England as well as an internal coup. 

Despite being Catholic, James became king in February 1685 with widespread support from the Protestant majority in England and Scotland. Many feared his exclusion would cause a repetition of the 16391653 Wars of the Three Kingdoms, while it was viewed as a short-term issue, since the heir presumptive was his Protestant elder daughter Mary. James soon lost popular support by suspending the Parliaments of Scotland and England in 1685, and thereafter ruling by personal decree.

Two events in June 1688 turned dissatisfaction into a political crisis. The first was the birth on 10 June of a male heir, James Francis Edward, displacing Mary and creating the prospect of a Catholic dynasty. The second was the prosecution for seditious libel of seven bishops from the Protestant Church of England. Many saw this as the latest in a series of attacks on the state church; their acquittal on 30 June sparked widespread anti-Catholic riots and destroyed James's political authority, since his presence as king now seemed a greater threat to stability than his removal. A coalition of English politicians, soldiers and religious leaders issued the Invitation to William, asking him to intervene militarily and "protect the Protestant religion".

Louis XIV of France launched the Nine Years War in September 1688, and on 5 November William landed in Brixham, Devon, with 20,000 men. He advanced on London, while the Royal Army disintegrated, and after negotiations broke down, James went into exile in France on 23 December. In April 1689, Parliament made William and Mary joint monarchs of England and Ireland. A separate but similar Scottish settlement was made in June.

While the Revolution itself was quick and relatively bloodless, pro-Stuart revolts in Scotland and Ireland caused significant casualties. Although Jacobitism persisted into the late 18th century, the Revolution ended a century of political dispute by confirming the primacy of Parliament over the Crown, a principle established in the Bill of Rights 1689. The Toleration Act 1688 granted freedom of worship to nonconformist Protestants, but restrictions on Catholics contained in the 1678 and 1681 English and Scottish Test Acts remained in force until 1828. Religious prohibitions on the monarch's choice of spouse were removed in 2015, but those applying to the monarch themselves remain.

Background
Despite his Catholicism, James became king in 1685 with widespread support, as demonstrated by the rapid defeat of the Argyll and Monmouth Rebellions; less than four years later, he was forced into exile. Often seen as an exclusively English event, modern historians argue James failed to appreciate the extent to which Royal power relied at the local level on the landed gentry, and the loss of that support fatally damaged his regime. The vast majority of the gentry in England and Scotland were Protestant, while even in largely Catholic Ireland a disproportionate number were members of the Protestant Church of Ireland. Although willing to accept James's personal religious beliefs, his backers did so only so long as he maintained the primacy of the Protestant Church of England and Church of Scotland. When his policies appeared to undermine the existing political and religious order, the result was to alienate his English and Scottish supporters and destabilise Ireland.

Stuart political ideology derived from James VI and I, who in 1603 had created a vision of a centralised state, run by a monarch whose authority came from God, and where the function of Parliament was simply to obey. Disputes over the relationship between king and Parliament led to the War of the Three Kingdoms and continued after the 1660 Stuart Restoration. Charles II came to rely on the Royal Prerogative since measures passed in this way could be withdrawn when he decided, rather than Parliament. However, it could not be used for major legislation or taxation.

Concern that James intended to create an absolute monarchy led to the 1679 to 1681 Exclusion Crisis, dividing the English political class into those who wanted to 'exclude' him from the throne, mostly Whigs, and their opponents, mostly Tories. However, in 1685 many Whigs feared the consequences of bypassing the 'natural heir', while Tories were often strongly anti-Catholic and their support assumed the continued primacy of the Church of England. Most importantly, it was seen as a short-term issue; James was 52, his marriage to Mary of Modena remained childless after 11 years, and the heirs were his Protestant daughters, Mary and Anne.

There was much greater sympathy in Scotland for a 'Stuart heir', and the 1681 Succession Act confirmed the duty of all to support him, 'regardless of religion.' Over 95 percent of Scots belonged to the national church or kirk; even other Protestant sects were banned, and by 1680, Catholics were a tiny minority confined to parts of the aristocracy and the remote Highlands. Episcopalians had regained control of the kirk in 1660, leading to a series of Presbyterian uprisings, but memories of the bitter religious conflicts of the Civil War period meant the majority preferred stability.

In England and Scotland, most of those who backed James in 1685 wanted to retain existing political and religious arrangements, but this was not the case in Ireland. While he was guaranteed support from the Catholic majority, James was also popular among Irish Protestants, since the Church of Ireland depended on Royal support for its survival, while Ulster was dominated by Presbyterians who supported his tolerance policies. However, religion was only one factor; of equal concern for Catholics were laws barring them from serving in the military or holding public office, and land reform. In 1600, 90% of Irish land was owned by Catholics but following a series of confiscation during the 17th century, this had dropped to 22% in 1685. Catholic and Protestant merchants in Dublin and elsewhere objected to commercial restrictions placing them at a disadvantage to their English competitors.

The political background in England

While James's supporters viewed hereditary succession as more important than his personal Catholicism, they opposed his policies of 'Tolerance' under which Catholics would be allowed to hold public office and engage in public life. Opposition was led by devout Anglicans who argued that the measures he proposed were incompatible with the oath he had sworn as king to uphold the supremacy of the Church of England. In an age when oaths were seen as fundamental to a stable society, by demanding that Parliament approve his measures James was seen not only to be breaking his own word but requiring others to do the same. Parliament refused to comply, despite being "the most Loyal Parliament a Stuart ever had".

Although historians generally accept James wished to promote Catholicism, not establish an Absolute monarchy, his stubborn and inflexible reaction to opposition had the same result. When the English and Scottish Parliaments refused to repeal the 1678 and 1681 Test Acts, he suspended them in November 1685 and ruled by decree. Attempts to form a 'King's party' of Catholics, English Dissenters and dissident Scottish Presbyterians was politically short-sighted, since it rewarded those who joined the 1685 rebellions and undermined his supporters.

Demanding tolerance for Catholics was also badly timed. In October 1685 Louis XIV of France issued the Edict of Fontainebleau revoking the 1598 Edict of Nantes which had given French Protestants the right to practise their religion; over the next four years, an estimated 200,000 to 400,000 went into exile, 40,000 of whom settled in London. Combined with Louis's expansionist policies and the killing of 2,000 Vaudois Protestants in 1686, it led to fears Protestant Europe was threatened by a Catholic counter-reformation. These concerns were reinforced by events in Ireland; the Lord Deputy, the Earl of Tyrconnell, wanted to create a Catholic establishment able to survive James's death, which meant replacing Protestant officials at a pace that was inherently destabilising.

Timeline of events: 1686 to 1688

The majority of those who backed James in 1685 did so because they wanted stability and the rule of law, qualities frequently undermined by his actions. After suspending Parliament in November 1685, he sought to rule by decree; although the principle was not disputed, the widening of its scope caused considerable concern, particularly when judges who disagreed with its application were dismissed. He then alienated many by perceived attacks on the established church; Henry Compton, Bishop of London, was suspended for refusing to ban John Sharp from preaching after he gave an anti-Catholic sermon.

He often made things worse by political clumsiness; to general fury, the Ecclesiastical Commission of 1686 established to discipline the Church of England included suspected Catholics like the Earl of Huntingdon. This was combined with an inability to accept opposition; in April 1687, he ordered Magdalen College, Oxford, to elect a Catholic sympathiser named Anthony Farmer as president, but as he was ineligible under the college statutes, the fellows elected John Hough instead. Both Farmer and Hough withdrew in favour of another candidate selected by James, who then demanded the fellows personally apologise on their knees for 'defying' him; when they refused, they were replaced by Catholics.

Attempts to create an alternative 'Kings Party' were never likely to succeed, as English Catholics made up only 1.1% of the population and Nonconformists 4.4%. Both groups were divided; since private worship was generally tolerated, Catholic moderates feared greater visibility would provoke a backlash. Among Nonconformists, while Quakers and Congregationalists supported repeal of the Test Acts, the majority wanted to amend the 1662 Act of Uniformity and be allowed back into the Church of England. When James ensured the election of the Presbyterian John Shorter as Lord Mayor of London in 1687, he insisted on complying with the Test Act, reportedly because of a 'distrust of the King's favour...thus encouraging that which His Majesties whole Endeavours were intended to disannull.'

To ensure a compliant Parliament, James required potential MPs to be approved by their local Lord Lieutenant; eligibility for both offices required positive answers in writing to the 'Three Questions', one being a commitment to repeal of the Test Act. In addition, local government and town corporations were purged to create an obedient electoral machine, further alienating the county gentry who had formed the majority of those who backed James in 1685. On 24 August 1688, writs were issued for a general election.

The expansion of the military caused great concern, particularly in England and Scotland, where memories of the Civil War left huge resistance to standing armies. In Ireland, Talbot replaced Protestant officers with Catholics; James did the same in England, while basing the troops at Hounslow appeared a deliberate attempt to overawe Parliament. In April 1688, he ordered his Declaration of Indulgence read in every church; when the Archbishop of Canterbury and six other bishops refused, they were charged with seditious libel and confined in the Tower of London. Two events turned dissent into a crisis; the birth of James Francis Edward Stuart on 10 June created the prospect of a Catholic dynasty, while the acquittal of the Seven Bishops on 30 June destroyed James's political authority.

Dutch intervention

Prelude: 1685 to June 1688

In 1677, James's elder daughter and heir Mary married her Protestant cousin William of Orange, stadtholder of the main provinces of the Dutch Republic. The two initially shared common objectives in wanting Mary to succeed her father, while French ambitions in the Spanish Netherlands threatened both English and Dutch trade. Although William sent James troops to help suppress the 1685 Monmouth Rebellion, their relationship deteriorated thereafter.

The Franco-Dutch War, continued French expansion, and expulsion of the Huguenots meant William assumed another war was inevitable, and although the States General of the Netherlands preferred peace, the majority accepted he was correct. This view was widely shared throughout Protestant Europe; in October 1685, Frederick William, Elector of Brandenburg renounced his French alliance for one with the Dutch. In July 1686, other Protestant states formed the anti-French League of Augsburg, with Dutch support; securing or neutralising English resources, especially the Royal Navy, now became key to both sides.

Following a skirmish between French and Dutch naval vessels in July 1686, William concluded English neutrality was not enough and he needed their active support in the event of war. His relationship with James was affected by the fact both men relied on advisors with relatively limited views; in William's case, mainly English and Scots Presbyterian exiles, the latter with close links to the Protestant minority in Ireland, who saw Tyrconnell's policies as a threat to their existence. Having largely alienated his Tory support base, James depended on a small circle of Catholic converts like Sunderland, Melfort and Perth.

Suspicions increased when James sought William's backing for repealing the Test Acts; he predictably refused, further damaging their relationship. Having previously assumed he was guaranteed English support in a war with France, William now worried he might face an Anglo-French alliance, despite assurances by James he had no intention of doing so. Historians argue these assurances were genuine, but James did not appreciate the distrust caused by his domestic policies. In August 1687, William's cousin de Zuylestein travelled to England with condolences on the death of Mary of Modena's mother, allowing him to make contact with the political opposition. Throughout 1688, his English supporters provided William detailed information on public opinion and developments, very little of which was intercepted.

In October 1687, after fourteen years of marriage and multiple miscarriages, it was announced the Queen was pregnant, Melfort immediately declaring it was a boy. When James then wrote to Mary urging her to convert to Catholicism, it convinced many he was seeking a Catholic heir, one way or the other and may have been a deciding factor in whether to invade. Early in 1688, a pamphlet circulated in England written by Dutch Grand Pensionary Gaspar Fagel; this guaranteed William's support for freedom of worship for Dissenters and retaining the Test Acts, unlike James who offered tolerance in return for repeal.

In April 1688, Louis XIV announced tariffs on Dutch herring imports, along with plans to support the Royal Navy in the English Channel. James immediately denied making any such request, but fearing it was the prelude to a formal alliance, the Dutch began preparing a military intervention. On the pretext of needing additional resources to deal with French privateers, in July the States General authorised an additional 9,000 sailors and 21 new warships.

Invitation to William

An invasion required domestic support, and at the end of April William met with Edward Russell, unofficial envoy for the Whig opposition. In a conversation recorded by Gilbert Burnet, he requested a formal invitation asking him to "rescue the nation and the religion", with a projected date of end September. William subsequently claimed he was 'forced' to take control of the conspiracy when Russell warned him the English would rise against James even without his help, and he feared this would lead to a republic, depriving his wife of her inheritance. 

Although this version is strongly disputed, Zuylestein returned to England in June, ostensibly to congratulate James on his new son, in reality to co-ordinate with William's supporters. Spurred by the prospect of a Catholic successor, the "Invitation to William" was quickly drafted by Henry Sydney, later described as "the great wheel on which the Revolution rolled".  The signatories were selected to represent a broad spectrum; Danby, a Whig, and Devonshire, a Tory; Henry Compton, Bishop of London, for the church; Shrewsbury and Lumley for the army, and finally Russell and Sydney for the navy. They promised to support a Dutch landing, but stressed the importance of acting quickly.

The Invitation was carried to The Hague on 30 June by Rear Admiral Herbert, disguised as a common sailor. Meanwhile, William's ally Bentinck launched a propaganda campaign in England, which presented him as a "true Stuart", but one without the faults of either James or Charles II. Much of the "spontaneous" support for William on his landing was organised by Bentinck and his agents.

Dutch preparations: July to September 1688

William's key strategic purpose was creating a defensive coalition that would block further French expansion in Europe, an objective not shared by the majority of his English supporters. In 1672, an alliance with the Electorate of Cologne had enabled France to bypass Dutch forward defences and nearly over-run the Republic, so ensuring an anti-French ruler was vital to prevent a repetition. As an ecclesiastical principality of the Holy Roman Empire, Cologne's ruler was nominated by Pope Innocent XI, in conjunction with Emperor Leopold I. Both Louis and James were in dispute with Innocent over the right to appoint Catholic bishops and clergy; when the old Elector died in June 1688, Innocent and Leopold ignored the French candidate in favour of Joseph Clemens of Bavaria.

After 1678, France continued its expansion into the Rhineland, including the 1683 to 1684 War of the Reunions, additional territorial demands in the Palatinate, and construction of forts at Landau and Traben-Trarbach. This presented an existential threat to Habsburg dominance, guaranteeing Leopold's support for the Dutch, and negating French attempts to build German alliances. William's envoy Johann von Görtz assured Leopold English Catholics would not be persecuted and intervention was to elect a free Parliament, not depose James, a convenient fiction that allowed him to remain neutral.

Although his English supporters considered a token force sufficient, William assembled 260 transport ships and 15,000 men, nearly half the 30,000 strong Dutch States Army. With France on the verge of war, their absence was of great concern to the States General and Bentinck hired 13,616 German mercenaries to man Dutch border fortresses, freeing elite units like the Scots Brigade for use in England. The increase could be presented as a limited precaution against French aggression, as the Dutch would typically double or triple their army strength in wartime; William instructed his experienced deputy Schomberg to prepare for a campaign in Germany.

Decision to invade

At the beginning of September, an invasion remained in the balance, with the States General fearing a French attack via Flanders while their army was in England. However, the surrender of Belgrade on 6 September seemed to presage an Ottoman collapse and release Austrian resources for use in Germany. Hoping to act before Leopold could respond and relieve pressure on the Ottomans, Louis attacked Philippsburg. With France now committed in Germany, this greatly reduced the threat to the Dutch.

Instead, Louis attempted to intimidate the States General, and on 9 September, his envoy D'Avaux handed them two letters. The first warned an attack on James meant war with France, the second any interference with French operations in Germany would end with the destruction of the Dutch state. Both misfired; convinced Louis was trying to drag him into war, James told the Dutch there was no secret Anglo-French alliance against them, although his denials only increased their suspicions. By confirming France's primary objective was the Rhineland, the second allowed William to move troops from the eastern border to the coast, even though most of the new mercenaries had yet to arrive.

On 22 September, the French seized over 100 Dutch ships, many owned by Amsterdam merchants; in response, on 26 September the Amsterdam City Council agreed to back William. This was a significant decision since the Council dominated the States of Holland, the most powerful political body in the Dutch Republic which contributed nearly 60% of its budget. French troops entered the Rhineland on 27 September and in a secret session held on 29th, William argued for a pre-emptive strike, as Louis and James would "attempt to bring this state to its ultimate ruin and subjugation, as soon as they find the occasion". This was accepted by the States, with the objective left deliberately vague, other than making the English "King and Nation live in a good relation, and useful to their friends and allies, and especially to this State".

Following their approval, the Amsterdam financial market raised a loan of four million guilders in only three days, with further financing coming from various sources, including two million guilders from the banker Francisco Lopes Suasso. The biggest concern for Holland was the potential impact on the Dutch economy and politics of William becoming ruler of England; the claim he had no intention of "removing the King from the throne" was not believed. These fears were arguably justified; William's access to English resources permanently diminished Amsterdam's power within the Republic and its status as the world's leading commercial and financial centre.

English defensive strategy

Neither James nor Sunderland trusted Louis, correctly suspecting that his support would continue only so long as it coincided with French interests, while Mary of Modena claimed his warnings were simply an attempt to drag England into an unwanted alliance. As a former naval commander, James appreciated the difficulties of a successful invasion, even in good weather, and as they moved into autumn the likelihood seemed to diminish. With the Dutch on the verge of war with France, he did not believe the States General would allow William to make the attempt; if they did, his army and navy were strong enough to defeat it.

Reasonable in theory, his reliance on the loyalty and efficiency of the military proved deeply flawed. Both the army and the navy remained overwhelmingly Protestant and anti-Catholic; in July, only personal intervention by James prevented a naval mutiny when a Catholic captain held Mass on his ship. The transfer of 2,500 Catholics from the Royal Irish Army to England in September led to clashes with Protestant troops, some of his most reliable units refused to obey orders, and many of their officers resigned.

When James demanded the repatriation of all six regiments of the Scots Brigade in January 1688, William refused but used the opportunity to purge those considered unreliable, a total of 104 officers and 44 soldiers. Some may have been Williamite agents, such as Colonel Belasyse, a Protestant with over 15 years of service who returned to his family estates in Yorkshire and made contact with Danby. The promotion of Catholic former Brigade officers like Thomas Buchan and Alexander Cannon to command positions led to the formation of the Association of Protestant Officers, which included senior veterans like Charles Trelawny, Churchill and Percy Kirke.

On 14 August, Churchill offered their support to William, helping convince him it was safe to risk an invasion; although James was aware of the conspiracy, he took no action. One reason may have been fears over the impact on the army; with a notional strength of 34,000, it looked impressive on paper but morale was brittle while many were untrained or lacked weapons. It also had to fill policing roles previously delegated to the militia, which had been deliberately allowed to decay; most of the 4,000 regular troops brought from Scotland in October had to be stationed in London to keep order. In October, attempts were made to restore the militia but many members were reportedly so angry at the changes made to local corporations, James was advised it was better not to raise them.

Widespread discontent and growing hostility to the Stuart regime was particularly apparent in North-East and South-West England, the two landing places identified by William. A Tory whose brother Jonathan was one of the Seven Bishops, Trelawny's commitment confirmed support from a powerful and well-connected West Country bloc, allowing access to the ports of Plymouth and Torbay. In the north, a force organised by Belasyse and Danby prepared to seize York, its most important city, and Hull, its largest port.

Herbert had been replaced by Dartmouth as commander of the fleet when he defected in June but many captains owed him their appointments and were of doubtful loyalty. Dartmouth suspected Berkeley and Grafton of plotting to overthrow him; to monitor them, he placed their ships next to his and minimised contact between the other vessels to prevent conspiracy. A lack of funds meant that excluding fireships and light scouting vessels, only 16 warships were available in early October, all third rates or fourth rates that were short of both men and supplies.

While The Downs was the best place to intercept a cross-Channel attack, it was also vulnerable to a surprise assault, even for ships fully manned and adequately provisioned. Instead, James placed his ships in a strong defensive position near Chatham Dockyard, believing the Dutch would seek to establish naval superiority before committing to a landing. While this had been the original plan, winter storms meant conditions deteriorated rapidly for those on the transports; William therefore decided to sail in convoy and avoid battle. The easterly winds that allowed the Dutch to cross prevented the Royal Navy leaving the Thames estuary and intervening.

The English fleet was outnumbered 2:1, undermanned, short of supplies and in the wrong place. Key landing locations in the South-West and Yorkshire had been secured by sympathisers, while both army and navy were led by officers whose loyalty was questionable. Even early in 1686, foreign observers doubted the military would fight for James against a Protestant heir and William claimed only to be securing the inheritance of his wife Mary. While still a dangerous undertaking, the invasion was less risky than it seemed.

Invasion

Embarkation of the army and the Declaration of The Hague

The Dutch preparations, though carried out with great speed, could not remain secret. The English envoy Ignatius White, the Marquess d'Albeville, warned his country: "an absolute conquest is intended under the specious and ordinary pretences of religion, liberty, property and a free Parliament". Louis threatened an immediate declaration of war if William proceeded and sent James 300,000 livres.

Embarkations, begun on 22 September (Gregorian calendar), had been completed on 8 October, and the expedition was that day openly approved by the States of Holland; the same day James issued a proclamation to the English nation that it should prepare for a Dutch invasion to ward off conquest. On 30 September/10 October (Julian/Gregorian calendars) William issued the Declaration of The Hague (actually written by Fagel), of which 60,000 copies of the English translation by Gilbert Burnet were distributed after the landing in England, in which he assured that his only aim was to maintain the Protestant religion, install a free parliament and investigate the legitimacy of the Prince of Wales. He would respect the position of James. William declared:

William went on to condemn James's advisers for overturning the religion, laws, and liberties of England, Scotland, and Ireland by the use of the suspending and dispensing power; the establishment of the "manifestly illegal" commission for ecclesiastical causes and its use to suspend the Bishop of London and to remove the Fellows of Magdalen College, Oxford. William also condemned James's attempt to repeal the Test Acts and the penal laws through pressuring individuals and waging an assault on parliamentary boroughs, as well as his purging of the judiciary. James's attempt to pack Parliament was in danger of removing "the last and great remedy for all those evils".

"Therefore", William continued, "we have thought fit to go over to England, and to carry over with us a force sufficient, by the blessing of God, to defend us from the violence of those evil Counsellors ... this our Expedition is intended for no other design, but to have, a free and lawful Parliament assembled as soon as is possible". On 4/14 October, William responded to the allegations by James in a second declaration, denying any intention to become king or to conquer England, a claim which remains controversial.

The swiftness of the embarkations surprised all foreign observers. Louis had in fact delayed his threats against the Dutch until early September because he assumed it then would be too late in the season to set the expedition in motion anyway, if their reaction proved negative; typically such an enterprise would take at least some months. Being ready after the last week of September / first week of October would normally have meant that the Dutch could have profited from the last spell of good weather, as the autumn storms tend to begin in the third week of that month. However, this year they came early. For three weeks, the invasion fleet was prevented by adverse south-westerly gales from departing from the naval port of Hellevoetsluis and Catholics all over the Netherlands and the British kingdoms held prayer sessions that this "popish wind" might endure. However, on 14/24 October, it became the famous "Protestant Wind" by turning to the east.

Crossing and landing

Although most of the warships were provided by the Admiralty of Amsterdam, the expedition was officially treated as a private affair, with the States General allowing William use of the Dutch army and fleet. For propaganda purposes, English admiral Arthur Herbert was nominally in command, but in reality operational control remained with Lieutenant-Admiral Cornelis Evertsen the Youngest and Vice-Admiral Philips van Almonde. Accompanied by Willem Bastiaensz Schepers, the Rotterdam shipping magnate who provided financing, William boarded the frigate Den Briel on 16/26 October. Roughly twice the size of the Spanish Armada, the fleet included 49 warships, 76 transports for the soldiers, 120 for the 5,000 horses required by the cavalry and supply train and 40,000 men on board of which 9,500 were sailors of the Dutch navy.

Having departed on 19/29 October, the expedition was halfway across the North Sea when it was scattered by a gale, forcing the Brill back to Hellevoetsluis on 21/31 October. William refused to go ashore and the fleet reassembled, having lost only one ship but nearly a thousand horses; press reports deliberately exaggerated the damage and claimed the expedition might be postponed until next spring. Dartmouth and his senior commanders considered taking advantage of this by blockading Hellevoetsluis, then decided against it, partly because the stormy weather made it dangerous but also because they could not rely on their men.

William replaced his losses and departed when the wind changed on 1/11 November, this time heading for Harwich where Bentinck had prepared a landing site. It has been suggested this was a feint to divert some of Dartmouth's ships north, which proved to be the case and when the wind shifted again, the Dutch armada sailed south into the Strait of Dover. In doing so, they twice passed the English fleet, which was unable to intercept because of the adverse winds and tides.

On 3/13 November, the invasion fleet entered the English Channel in an enormous formation 25 ships deep, the troops lined up on deck, firing musket volleys, colours flying and military bands playing. Intended to awe observers with its size and power, Rapin de Thoyras later described it as "the most magnificent and affecting spectacle...ever seen by human eyes". The same wind blowing the Dutch down the Channel kept Dartmouth confined in the Thames estuary; by the time he was able to make his way out, he was too far behind to stop William reaching Torbay on 5 November.

As anticipated, the French fleet remained in the Mediterranean, in order to support an attack on the Papal States if needed, while a south-westerly gale now forced Dartmouth to shelter in Portsmouth harbour and kept him there for two days, allowing William to complete his disembarkation undisturbed. The regular Dutch troops amounted to 14,000-15,000 men, consisting of around 11,000 infantry, including nearly 5,000 members of the elite Anglo-Scots Brigade and Dutch Blue Guards, 3,660 cavalry and an artillery train of twenty-one 24-pounder cannon.

Some 5,000 volunteers, consisting of British exiles and Huguenots, also accompanied the fleet, making a total army of over 20,000 men.  William brought these volunteers along to accelerate English army reforms, because they could replace the soldiers who were loyal to James. William brought weapons to equip another 20,000 men, although the subsequent and rapid collapse of James's army meant the 12,000 local volunteers who joined by 20 November were eventually dismissed.

The collapse of James's rule

Panicked by the prospect of invasion, James met with the bishops on 28 September, offering concessions; five days later they presented demands, which included restoring the religious position to that prevailing in February 1685, along with free elections for a new Parliament. Although they hoped this would allow James to remain king, in reality there was little chance of this, since at a minimum he would have to disinherit his son, enforce the Test Acts, and accept the supremacy of Parliament, all of which were unacceptable. In addition, by now his Whig opponents did not trust him to keep his promises, while Tories like Danby were too committed to William to escape punishment.

Although his veteran force had the capability of defeating the largely untested recruits of the Royal Army, William and his English supporters preferred to avoid bloodshed and allow the regime to collapse on its own. Landing in Torbay provided space and time for this, while heavy rainfall forced a slow advance regardless and to avoid alienating the local population by looting, his troops were well supplied and paid three months in advance. On 9 November, he entered Exeter and issued a proclamation stating his objectives were only to secure the rights of his wife and a free Parliament. There was little enthusiasm for either James or William and the general mood was one of confusion and distrust. After Danby had the Declaration publicly read in York on 12 November, much of the northern gentry confirmed their backing and the document was widely distributed.

On 19 November, James joined his main force of 19,000 at Salisbury, but it soon became apparent his army was not eager to fight and the loyalty of his commanders doubtful. Three regiments sent out on 15 November to make contact with William promptly defected, while supply problems left the rest short of food and ammunition. On 20 November, dragoons led by Irish Catholic Patrick Sarsfield clashed with Williamite scouts at Wincanton; along with a minor skirmish at Reading on 9 December, also featuring Sarsfield, these were the only substantial military actions of the campaign. After securing his rear by taking Plymouth on 18 November, William began his advance on 21 November, while Danby and Belasyse captured York and Hull several days later.

James's commander Feversham and other senior officers advised retreat. Lacking information on William's movements, unable to rely on his own soldiers, worn out by lack of sleep and debilitating nose-bleeds, on 23 November James agreed. Next day Churchill, Grafton and Princess Anne's husband George deserted to William, followed by Anne herself on 26 November. The next day, James held a meeting at Whitehall Palace with those peers still in London; with the exception of Melfort, Perth and other Catholics, they urged him to issue writs for a Parliamentary election and negotiate with William.

On 8 December, Halifax, Nottingham and Godolphin met with William at Hungerford to hear his demands, which included the dismissal of Catholics from public office and funding for his army. Many viewed these as a reasonable basis for a settlement but James decided to flee the country, convinced by Melfort and others that his life was threatened – a suggestion generally dismissed by historians. William made it clear he would not allow James to be harmed, most Tories wanted him to retain his throne, while the Whigs simply wanted to drive him out of the country by imposing conditions he would refuse.

The Queen and Prince of Wales left for France on 9 December, James following separately on 10 December. Accompanied only by Edward Hales and Ralph Sheldon, he made his way to Faversham in Kent seeking passage to France, first dropping the Great Seal in the River Thames in a last-ditch attempt to prevent Parliament being summoned. In London, his flight and rumours of a "Papist" invasion led to riots and destruction of Catholic property, which quickly spread throughout the country. To fill the power vacuum, the Earl of Rochester set up a temporary government including members of the Privy Council and City of London authorities, but it took them two days to restore order.

When news arrived James had been captured in Faversham on 11 December by local fishermen, Lord Ailesbury, one of his personal attendants, was sent to escort him back to London. On entering the city on 16 December, he was welcomed by cheering crowds. By making it seem that James remained in control, Tory loyalists hoped for a settlement which would leave them in government. To create an appearance of normality, he heard Mass and presided over a meeting of the Privy Council. James made it clear to the French ambassador Paul Barillon that he still intended to escape to France. His few remaining supporters viewed his flight as cowardice, and a failure to ensure law and order criminally negligent.

Happy to help him into exile, William recommended he relocate to Ham, largely because it was easy to escape from. James suggested Rochester instead, allegedly because his personal guard was there, in reality conveniently positioned for a ship to France. On 18 December, he left London with a Dutch escort as William entered, cheered by the same crowds who greeted his predecessor two days before. On 22 December, Berwick arrived in Rochester with blank passports allowing them to leave England, while his guards were told that if James wanted to leave, "they should not prevent him, but allow him to gently slip through". Although Ailesbury and others begged him to stay, he left for France on 23 December.

The revolutionary settlement

James's departure significantly shifted the balance of power in favour of William, who took control of the provisional government on 28 December. He was now master of England and in control of the country's army, navy, and finances. Elections were held in early January for a Convention Parliament, which assembled on 22 January. The Whigs had a slight majority in the Commons and the Lords was dominated by the Tories, but both were led by moderates. Archbishop Sancroft and other Stuart loyalists wanted to preserve the line of succession; they recognised keeping James on the throne was no longer possible, so they preferred Mary either be appointed his regent or sole monarch.

The next two weeks were spent debating how to resolve this issue, much to the annoyance of William, who needed a swift resolution; the situation in Ireland was rapidly deteriorating, while the French had over-run large parts of the Rhineland and were preparing to attack the Dutch. At a meeting with Danby and Halifax on 3 February, he announced his intention to return home if the Convention did not appoint him joint monarch; Mary let it be known she would only rule jointly with her husband. Faced with this ultimatum, on 6 February Parliament declared that in deserting his people James had abdicated and thus vacated the Crown, which was therefore offered jointly to William and Mary.

Historian Tim Harris argues the most radical act of the 1688 Revolution was breaking the succession and establishing the idea of a "contract" between ruler and people, a fundamental rebuttal of the Stuart ideology of divine right. While this was a victory for the Whigs, other pieces of legislation were proposed by the Tories, often with moderate Whig support, designed to protect the Anglican establishment from being undermined by future monarchs, including the Calvinist William. The Declaration of Right was a tactical compromise, setting out where James had failed and establishing the rights of English citizens, without agreeing their cause or offering solutions. In December 1689, this was incorporated into the Bill of Rights

However, there were two areas that arguably broke new constitutional ground, both responses to what were viewed as specific abuses by James. First, the Declaration of Right made keeping a standing army without Parliamentary consent illegal, overturning the 1661 and 1662 Militia Acts and vesting control of the military in Parliament, not the Crown. The second was the Coronation Oath Act 1688; the result of James's perceived failure to comply with that taken in 1685, it established obligations owed by the monarchy to the people.

At their coronation on 11 April, William and Mary swore to "govern the people of this kingdom of England, and the dominions thereunto belonging, according to the statutes in Parliament agreed on, and the laws and customs of the same". They were also to maintain the Protestant Reformed faith and "preserve inviolable the settlement of the Church of England, and its doctrine, worship, discipline and government as by law established".

Scotland and Ireland

While Scotland was not involved in the landing, by November 1688 only a tiny minority supported James. Many of those who accompanied William were Scots exiles, including Melville, the Duke of Argyll, his personal chaplain William Carstares and Gilbert Burnet. News of James's flight led to celebrations and anti-Catholic riots in Edinburgh and Glasgow. Most members of the Scottish Privy Council went to London. On 7 January 1689, they asked William to take over government. Elections were held in March for a Scottish Convention, which was also a contest between Presbyterians and Episcopalians for control of the Kirk. While only 50 of the 125 delegates were classed as Episcopalian, they were hopeful of victory since William supported the retention of bishops.

On 16 March a Letter from James was read out to the convention, demanding obedience and threatening punishment for non-compliance. Public anger at its tone meant some Episcopalians stopped attending the convention, claiming to fear for their safety and others changed sides. The 1689–1691 Jacobite Rising forced William to make concessions to the Presbyterians, ended Episcopacy in Scotland and excluded a significant portion of the political class. Many later returned to the Kirk but Non-Juring Episcopalianism was the key determinant of Jacobite support in 1715 and 1745.

The English Parliament held that James 'abandoned' his throne. The Convention argued that he 'forfeited' it by his actions, as listed in the Articles of Grievances. On 11 April, the Convention ended James's reign and adopted the Articles of Grievances and the Claim of Right Act, making Parliament the primary legislative power in Scotland. On 11 May, William and Mary accepted the Crown of Scotland; after their acceptance, the Claim and the Articles were read aloud, leading to an immediate debate over whether or not an endorsement of these documents was implicit in that acceptance.

Under the 1542 Crown of Ireland Act, the English monarch was automatically king of Ireland as well. Tyrconnell had created a largely Roman Catholic army and administration which was reinforced in March 1689 when James landed in Ireland with French military support; it took the two years of fighting of the Williamite War in Ireland before the new regime controlled Ireland.

Anglo-Dutch alliance

Though he had carefully avoided making it public, William's main motive in organising the expedition had been the opportunity to bring England into an alliance against France. On 9 December 1688 he had already asked the States General to send a delegation of three to negotiate the conditions. On 18 February (Julian calendar) he asked the convention to support the Republic in its war against France. It refused, only consenting to pay £600,000 for the continued presence of the Dutch army in England. On 9 March (Gregorian calendar) the States General responded to Louis's earlier declaration of war by declaring war on France in return.

On 19 April (Julian calendar) the Dutch delegation signed a naval treaty with England. It stipulated that the combined Anglo-Dutch fleet would always be commanded by an Englishman, even when of lower rank. The Dutch agreed to this to make their dominance over the English army less painful for the British. William had after all placed several Dutch officers and officials in key positions in the English military organisation, in order to reorganise the English army according to the Dutch model. The treaty also specified that the two parties would contribute in the ratio of five English vessels against three Dutch vessels, meaning in practice that the Dutch navy in the future would be smaller than the English. The Navigation Acts were not repealed. On 18 May the new Parliament allowed William to declare war on France. On 9 September 1689 (Gregorian calendar), William as King of England joined the League of Augsburg against France.

The decline of the Dutch Republic
Having England as an ally meant that the military situation of the Republic was strongly improved, but this very fact induced William to be uncompromising in his position towards France. This policy led to a large number of very expensive campaigns which were largely paid for with Dutch funds. In 1712 the Republic was financially exhausted and was forced to let its fleet deteriorate, making what was by then the Kingdom of Great Britain the dominant maritime power of the world.

The Dutch economy, already burdened by the high national debt and concomitant high taxation, suffered from the other European states' protectionist policies, which its weakened fleet was no longer able to resist. To make matters worse, the main Dutch trading and banking houses moved much of their activity from Amsterdam to London after 1688. Between 1688 and 1720, world trade dominance shifted from the Republic to Britain.

Assessment and historiography
While the 1688 revolution was labeled "Glorious" by Protestant preachers two decades later, its historiography is complex, and its assessment disputed. Thomas Macaulay's account of the Revolution in The History of England from the Accession of James the Second exemplifies the "Whig history" narrative of the Revolution as a largely consensual and bloodless triumph of English common sense, confirming and strengthening its institutions of tempered popular liberty and limited monarchy. Edmund Burke set the tone for that interpretation when he proclaimed that:

An alternative narrative emphasizes William's successful foreign invasion from the Netherlands, and the size of the corresponding military operation. Several researchers have emphasized that aspect, particularly after the third centenary of the event in 1988. The historian J. R. Jones suggested that the invasion "should be seen ... as the first and arguably the only decisive phase of the Nine Years' War." The invasion story is unusual because the establishment of a constitutional monarchy (a de facto republic, see Coronation Oath Act 1688) and Bill of Rights meant that the apparently invading monarchs, legitimate heirs to the throne, were prepared to govern with the English Parliament. It is difficult to classify the entire proceedings of 1687–1689 but it can be seen that the events occurred in three parts: conspiracy, invasion by Dutch forces, and "Glorious Revolution".

It has been argued that the invasion aspect had been downplayed as a result of British pride and effective Dutch propaganda, trying to depict the course of events as a largely internal English affair. As the invitation was initiated by figures who had little influence, the legacy of the Glorious Revolution has been described as a successful propaganda act by William to cover up and justify his invasion. The claim that William was fighting for the Protestant cause in England was used to great effect to disguise the military, cultural and political impact that the Dutch regime had on England.

A third version, proposed by Steven Pincus, underplays the invasion aspect but unlike the Whig narrative views the Revolution as a divisive and violent event that involved all classes of the English population, not just the main aristocratic protagonists. Pincus argues that his interpretation echoes the widely held view of the Revolution in its aftermath, starting with its revolutionary labelling. Pincus argues that it was momentous especially when looking at the alternative that James was trying to enact – a powerful centralised autocratic state, using French-style "state-building". England's role in Europe and the country's political economy in the 17th century rebuts the view of many late-20th-century historians that nothing revolutionary occurred during the Glorious Revolution of 1688–89. Pincus says it was not a placid turn of events.

In diplomacy and economics William III transformed the English state's ideology and policies. This occurred not because William III was an outsider who inflicted foreign notions on England but because foreign affairs and political economy were at the core of the English revolutionaries' agenda. The revolution of 1688–89 cannot be fathomed in isolation. It would have been inconceivable without the changes resulting from the events of the 1640s and 1650s. The ideas accompanying the Glorious Revolution were rooted in the mid-century upheavals. The 17th century was a century of revolution in England, deserving of the same scholarly attention that 'modern' revolutions attract.

James II tried building a powerful militarised state on the mercantilist assumption that the world's wealth was necessarily finite and empires were created by taking land from other states. The East India Company was thus an ideal tool to create a vast new English imperial dominion by warring with the Dutch and the Mughal Empire in India. After 1689 came an alternative understanding of economics, which saw Britain as a commercial rather than an agrarian society. It led to the foundation of the Bank of England, the creation of Europe's first widely circulating credit currency and the commencement of the "Age of Projectors". This subsequently gave weight to the view, advocated most famously by Adam Smith in 1776, that wealth was created by human endeavour and was thus potentially infinite.

Impact
As a coup, albeit largely bloodless, its legitimacy rests in the will expressed separately by the Scottish and English Parliaments according to their respective legal processes. On this point, the Earl of Shaftesbury declared in 1689, "The Parliament of England is that supreme and absolute power, which gives life and motion to the English government". The Revolution established the primacy of parliamentary sovereignty, a principle still relevant in consultation with the 15 Commonwealth realms regarding succession issues. The Bill of Rights 1689 formally established a system of constitutional monarchy and ended moves towards absolute monarchy by restricting the power of the monarch, who could no longer suspend laws, levy taxes, make royal appointments or maintain a standing army during peacetime without Parliament's consent. The British Army remains the military arm of Parliament, not the monarch, although the Crown is the source of all military executive authority.

Unlike the 1638 to 1651 Wars of the Three Kingdoms, most ordinary people in England and Scotland were relatively untouched by the "Glorious Revolution", the majority of the bloodshed taking place in Ireland. As a consequence, some historians suggest that in England at least it more closely resembles a coup d'état, rather than a social upheaval such as the French Revolution. This view is consistent with the original meaning of "revolution" as a circular process under which an old system of values is restored to its original position, with England's supposed "ancient constitution" being reasserted, rather than formed anew. Contemporary English political thought, as expressed in John Locke's then popular social contract theory, linked to George Buchanan's view of the contractual agreement between the monarch and their subjects, an argument used by the Scottish Parliament as justification for the Claim of Right.

Under the Coronation Oath Act 1688, William had sworn to maintain the primacy of the Church of England, which both his native Dutch Reformed Church and the Church of Scotland viewed as ideologically suspect in both doctrine and use of bishops. This required a certain degree of religious flexibility on his part, especially as he needed to placate his Catholic allies, Spain and Emperor Leopold. Despite promising legal toleration for Catholics in his Declaration of October 1688, William failed due to domestic opposition. The Act of Toleration 1689 granted relief to Nonconformists but Catholic emancipation would be delayed until 1829.

The Williamite War in Ireland can be seen as the source of later ethno-religious conflict, including The Troubles of the twentieth century. The Williamite victory in Ireland is still commemorated by the Orange Order for preserving British and Protestant supremacy in the country. In North America, the Glorious Revolution precipitated the 1689 Boston revolt in which a well-organised "mob" of provincial militia and citizens deposed the hated governor Edmund Andros. In New York, Leisler's Rebellion caused the colonial administrator, Francis Nicholson, to flee to England. A third event, Maryland's Protestant Rebellion was directed against the proprietary government, seen as Catholic-dominated.

Footnotes

Citations

Sources
 
 
 
 
 
 
 
 
 
 
 
 
 
 
 
 
 
 
 
 
 ;

Further reading

External links

 
 
 
 
 
 
 
 

 
1688 in England
1688 in Ireland
1688 in Scotland
17th-century coups d'état and coup attempts
17th-century revolutions
Anti-Catholicism in England
Anti-Catholicism in Northern Ireland
Anti-Catholicism in Scotland
Anti-Catholicism in the United Kingdom
Anti-Catholicism in Wales
British monarchy
Civil wars in England
Conflicts in 1688
Invasions of England
James II of England
Mary II of England
Military coups in England
Netherlands–United Kingdom relations
Rebellions in England
The Restoration
Stuart England
Succession to the British crown
William III of England